This is a list of the number-one hit singles in 1969 in Denmark. The charts were produced by the IFPI Danmark and were published in the newspaper Ekstra Bladet. Prior to April 1969, the IFPI had produced a monthly chart, but switched to a weekly chart after the closure of the Danmarks Radio Top 20 chart.

Notes

References

1969 in Denmark
Denmark
Lists of number-one songs in Denmark